Yoruba (Yor. ;) is a language spoken in West Africa, primarily in Southwestern and Central Nigeria. It is spoken by the ethnic Yoruba people. The number of Yoruba speakers is roughly 50 million, plus about 5 million second-language speakers. As a pluricentric language, it is primarily spoken in a dialectal area spanning Nigeria and Benin with smaller migrated communities in Côte d'Ivoire, Sierra Leone and The Gambia.

Yoruba vocabulary is also used in the Afro-Brazilian religion known as Candomblé, in the Caribbean religion of Santería in the form of the liturgical Lucumí language and various Afro-American religions of North America. Practitioners of these religions in the Americas no longer speak or understand the Yorùbá language, rather they use remnants of Yorùbá language for singing songs that for them are shrouded in mystery. Usage of a lexicon of  Yorùbá words and short phrases during ritual is also common, but they have gone through changes due to the fact that Yorùbá is no longer a vernacular for them and fluency is not required.

As the principal Yoruboid language, Yoruba is most closely related to the languages Itsekiri (spoken in the Niger Delta), and Igala (spoken in central Nigeria).

History 

Yoruba is classified among the Edekiri languages, which is together with the Itsekiri and isolate Igala from the Yoruboid group of languages within the Volta–Niger branch of the Niger–Congo family.
The linguistic unity of the Niger–Congo family dates to deep pre-history, estimates ranging around 11,000 years ago (the end of the Upper Paleolithic). In present-day Nigeria, it is estimated that there are around 50 million Yoruba primary and secondary language speakers, as well as several other millions of speakers outside Nigeria, making it the most widely spoken African language outside of the continent.

Location of Yoruba speakers
Yoruba is the dominant language in the following areas:

Nigeria
Ekiti State
 Lagos State
Ogun State
Ondo State
Osun State
Oyo State
Kwara State
 Western Kogi State (Okun people and Oworo people)

Benin
Ouémé Department
Plateau Department
Collines Department
Borgou Department (Tchaourou)
Donga Department (Bassila).

Togo
Plateaux Region (Anié Prefecture, Ogou Prefecture, Est-Mono Prefecture)
Centrale Region (Tchamba Prefecture).

Yoruboid languages 

The Yoruba group is assumed to have developed out of undifferentiated Volta–Niger populations by the 1st millennium BC. Settlements of early Yoruba speakers are assumed to correspond to those found in the wider Niger area from about the 4th century BC, especially at Ife. 
The North-West Yoruba dialects show more linguistic innovation than the Southeast and Central dialects. This, combined with the fact that the latter areas generally have older settlements, suggests a later date for migration into Northwestern Yorubaland. According to the Kay Williamson Scale, the following is the degree of relationship between Itsekiri and other Yoruboid dialects, using a compiled word list of the most common words. A similarity of 100% would mean a total overlap of two dialects, while similarity of 0 would mean two speech areas that have absolutely no relationship.

The result of the wordlist analysis shows that Itsekiri bears the strongest similarity to the South-East Yoruba dialects and most especially Ilaje and Ikale, at 80.4% and 82.3% similarity. According to the language assessment criteria of the International Language Assessment Conference (1992), only when a wordlist analysis shows a lexical similarity of below 70% are two speech forms considered to be different languages. An overlap of 70% and above indicates that both speech forms are the same language, although dialect intelligibility tests would need to be carried out to determine how well speakers of one dialect can understand the other speech form.
Thus while the analysis shows that Igala, with an overlap of 60% is a completely different language, all other Yoruboid speech forms are merely dialects of the same Language.

Varieties 
The Yoruba dialect continuum itself consists of several dialects. The various Yoruba dialects in the Yorubaland of Nigeria can be classified into five major dialect areas: Northwest, Northeast, Central, Southwest, and Southeast. Clear boundaries cannot be drawn, peripheral areas of dialectal regions often have some similarities to adjoining dialects.

 North-West Yoruba (NWY)
 Egba, Ibadan, Yewa, Ọyọ, Lagos/Eko.

 North-East Yoruba (NEY)
Yagba, Owe, Ijumu, Oworo, Gbede, Abunu, Oworo
 Central Yoruba (CY)
 Igbomina, Ijesha, Ifẹ, Ekiti (including Akurẹ), Ẹfọn, Western Akoko

 South-West Yoruba (SWY)
 Ketu, Awori, Sakété, Ifè (Togo), Idasha, Ipokia/Anago.
 South-East Yoruba (SEY)
 Ikale, Ilaje, Ondo, Ọwọ, Remo, Ijẹbu, Usen.

North-West Yoruba was historically spoken in the Ọyọ Empire. In NWY dialects, Proto-Yoruba velar fricative  and labialized voiced velar /gʷ/ have merged into /w/; the upper vowels /ɪ/ and /ʊ/ were raised and merged with /i/ and /u/, just as their nasal counterparts, resulting in a vowel system with seven oral and three nasal vowels.

South-East Yoruba was probably associated with the expansion of the Benin Empire after c. 1450. In contrast to NWY, lineage, and descent are largely multilineal and cognatic, and the division of titles into war and civil is unknown. Linguistically, SEY has retained the /ɣ/ and /gw/ contrast, while it has lowered the nasal vowels /ĩ/ and /ʊ̃/ to /ɛ̃/ and /ɔ̃/, respectively. SEY has collapsed the second and third-person plural pronominal forms; thus, àn án wá can mean either 'you (pl.) came' or 'they came' in SEY dialects, whereas NWY for example has ẹ wá 'you (pl.) came' and wọ́n wá 'they came', respectively. The emergence of a plural of respect may have prevented the coalescence of the two in NWY dialects.

Central Yoruba forms a transitional area in that the lexicon has much in common with NWY, and it shares many ethnographical features with SEY. Its vowel system is the least innovative (most stable) of the three dialect groups, having retained nine oral-vowel contrasts and six or seven nasal vowels, and an extensive vowel harmony system. Peculiar to Central and Eastern (NEY, SEY) Yoruba also, is the ability to begin words with the vowel [ʊ:] which in Western Yoruba has been changed to [ɪ:]

Literary Yoruba 
Literary Yoruba, also known as Standard Yoruba, Yoruba koiné, and common Yoruba, is a separate member of the dialect cluster. It is the written form of the language, the standard variety learned at school, and that is spoken by newsreaders on the radio. Standard Yoruba has its origin in the 1850s, when Samuel A. Crowther, the first native African Anglican bishop, published a Yoruba grammar and started his translation of the Bible. Though for a large part based on the Ọyọ and Ibadan dialects, Standard Yoruba incorporates several features from other dialects. It also has some features peculiar to itself, for example, the simplified vowel harmony system, as well as foreign structures, such as calques from English which originated in early translations of religious works.

Because the use of Standard Yoruba did not result from some deliberate linguistic policy, much controversy exists as to what constitutes 'genuine Yoruba', with some writers holding the opinion that the Ọyọ dialect is the "pure" form, and others stating that there is no such thing as genuine Yoruba at all.  Standard Yoruba, the variety learned at school and used in the media, has nonetheless been a powerful consolidating factor in the emergence of a common Yoruba identity

Writing systems 

The earliest evidence of the presence of Islam and literacy goes back to the 14th century. The earliest documented history of the people, which is traced to the latter part of the 17th century, was in the Yoruba language but in the Arabic script (Ajami). This makes Yoruba one of the oldest African languages with an attested history of Ajami. (Cf. Mumin & Versteegh 2014; Hofheinz 2018). However, the oldest, extant Yoruba Ajami exemplar is a 19th-century Islamic verse (waka) by Badamasi Agbaji (d. 1895- Hunwick 1995). There are several items of Yoruba Ajami in poetry, personal notes, and esoteric knowledge (Cf. Bang 2019), among others. Nevertheless, Yoruba Ajami remained idiosyncratic and not socially diffused, as there was no standardized orthography. The plethora of dialects, and the absence of a central promotional institution, among others, are responsible.

In the 17th century, Yoruba was written in the Ajami script, a form of Arabic script. It is still written in the Ajami writing script in some Islamic circles. Standard Yoruba orthography originated in the early work of Church Mission Society missionaries working among the Aku (Yoruba) of Freetown. One of their informants was Crowther, who later would proceed to work on his native language himself. In early grammar primers and translations of portions of the English Bible, Crowther used the Latin alphabet largely without tone markings. Over the years the orthography was revised to represent tone among other things. In 1875, the Church Missionary Society (CMS) organized a conference on Yoruba Orthography; the standard devised there was the basis for the orthography of the steady flow of religious and educational literature over the next seventy years.

The current orthography of Yoruba derives from a 1966 report of the Yoruba Orthography Committee, along with Ayọ Bamgboṣe's 1965 Yoruba Orthography, a study of the earlier orthographies and an attempt to bring Yoruba orthography in line with actual speech as much as possible. Previously, the vertical line had been used to avoid the mark being fully covered by an underline, as in ⟨e̩⟩, ⟨o̩⟩, ⟨s̩⟩; however, that usage is no longer common.

In addition to the underdots, three further diacritics are used on vowels and syllabic nasal consonants to indicate the language's tones: an acute accent  for the high tone, a grave accent  for the low tone, and an optional macron  for the middle tone. When more than one tone is used in one syllable, the vowel can either be written once for each tone (for example, * for a vowel  with tone rising from low to high) or, more rarely in current usage, combined into a single accent. In this case, a caron  is used for the rising tone (so the previous example would be written ), and a circumflex  for the falling tone. 

In Benin, Yoruba uses a different orthography. The Yoruba alphabet was standardized along with other Benin languages in the National Languages Alphabet by the National Language Commission in 1975, and revised in 1990 and 2008 by the National Center for Applied Linguistics.
 

In 2011, a Beninese priest-chief by the name of Tolúlàṣẹ Ògúntósìn devised his system based on a vision received in his sleep believed to have been granted from Oduduwa. This "Oduduwa alphabet" system has also received approval and support from other prominent chiefs in the Yorubaland region.

Phonology 
The syllable structure of Yoruba is (C)V(N). Syllabic nasals are also possible. Every syllable bears one of the three tones: high , mid   (generally left unmarked), and low . The sentence n̄ ò lọ (I didn't go) provides examples of three syllable types:
n̄ —  — I
ò —  — not (negation)
lọ —  — to go

Vowels 
Standard Yoruba has seven oral and five nasal vowels. There are no diphthongs in Yoruba; sequences of vowels are pronounced as separate syllables. Dialects differ in the number of vowels they have; see above.

 In some cases, the phonetic realization of these vowels is noticeably different from what the symbol suggests:
 The oral  is close front , and the nasal  varies between close front  and near-close front .
 The oral  is close back , and the nasal  varies between close near-back , close back , near-close near-back  and near-close back .
 The oral  are close-mid , and do not have nasal counterparts.
 The oral  is open-mid , and the nasal  varies between mid  and open-mid .
 The oral  is near-open , and the nasal  varies between open-mid  and near-open .
 The oral  is central .

The status of a fifth nasal vowel, is controversial.

Consonants 

The rhotic consonant is realized as a flap  or, in some varieties (notably Lagos Yoruba), as the alveolar approximant  due to English influence. It's particularly common with Yoruba-English bilinguals.

Like many other languages of the region, Yoruba has the voiceless and voiced labial–velar stops  and : pápá  'field',   'all'.

Yoruba also lacks a phoneme ; the letter  is used for the sound in the orthography, but strictly speaking, it refers to an allophone of  immediately preceding a nasal vowel.

There is also a syllabic nasal, which forms a syllable nucleus by itself. When it precedes a vowel, it is a velar nasal : n ò lọ  'I didn't go'. In other cases, its place of articulation is homorganic with the following consonant: ó ń lọ  'he is going', ó ń fò  'he is jumping'.

Tone 
Yoruba is a tonal language with three-level tones and two or three contour tones. Every syllable must have at least one tone; a syllable containing a long vowel can have two tones. Tones are marked by use of the acute accent for high tone and the grave accent for low tone; mid is unmarked, except on syllabic nasals where it is indicated using a macron. Examples:
 H: ó bẹ́ [ó bɛ́] 'he jumped'; síbí [síbí]  'spoon'
 M: ó bẹ [ó bɛ̄] 'he is forward'; ara [āɾā] 'body'
 L: ó bẹ̀ [ó bɛ̀] 'he asks for pardon'; ọ̀kọ̀  [ɔ̀kɔ̀] 'spear'.
When teaching Yoruba literacy, solfège names of musical notes are used to name the tones: low is do, mid is re, and high is mi.

Whistled Yoruba 

Apart from the lexical and grammatical use of tone, it is also used in other contexts such as whistling and drumming. Whistled Yoruba is used to communicate over long distances. As speakers talk and whistle simultaneously, the language is transformed: consonants are devoiced or turned to [h] and all vowels are changed to [u]. However, all tones are retained without any alteration. The retention of tones enables speakers to understand the meaning of the whistled language. The Yoruba talking drum ‘Dùndún’or 'iya ilu' which accompanies singing during festivals and important ceremonies also uses tone.

Tonality effects and computer-coded documents 
Written Yoruba includes diacritical marks not available on conventional computer keyboards, requiring some adaptations. In particular, the use of the sub dots and tone marks are not represented, so many Yoruba documents simply omit them. Asubiaro Toluwase, in his 2014 paper, points out that the use of these diacritics can affect the retrieval of Yoruba documents by popular search engines. Therefore, their omission can have a significant impact on online research.

Assimilation and elision 
When a word precedes another word beginning with a vowel, assimilation, or deletion ('elision') of one of the vowels often takes place. In fact, since syllables in Yoruba normally end in a vowel, and most nouns start with one, it is a very common phenomenon, and it is absent only in very slow, unnatural speech. The orthography here follows speech in that word divisions are normally not indicated in words that are contracted as a result of assimilation or elision: ra ẹja → rẹja 'buy fish'. Sometimes, however, authors may choose to use an inverted comma to indicate an elided vowel as in ní ilé → n'ílé 'in the house'.

Long vowels within words usually signal that a consonant has been elided word-internally. In such cases, the tone of the elided vowel is retained: àdìrò → ààrò 'hearth'; koríko → koóko 'grass'; òtító → òótó 'truth'.

Vocabulary

Roots
Most verbal roots are monosyllabic of the phonological shape CV(N), for example: dá (to create), dán (to polish), kpọ́n (to be red). Verbal roots that don't seem to follow this pattern are mostly former compounds in which a syllable has been elided. For example: nlá (to be large), originally a compound of ní (to have) + lá (to be big) and súfèé (to whistle), originally a compound of sú (to eject wind) + òfé or ìfé (a blowing). Vowels serve as nominalizing prefixes that turn a verb into a noun form. 
 
Nominal roots are mostly disyllabic, for example: abà (crib, barn), ara (body), ibà (fever). Monosyllabic and even trisyllabic roots do occur but they are less common.

Grammar 

Yoruba is a highly isolating language. Its basic constituent order is subject–verb–object, as in ó nà Adé 'he beat Adé'. The bare verb stem denotes a completed action, often called perfect; tense and aspect are marked by preverbal particles such as ń 'imperfect/present continuous', ti 'past'. Negation is expressed by a preverbal particle kò. Serial verb constructions are common, as in many other languages of West Africa.

Although Yoruba has no grammatical gender, it has a distinction between human and non-human nouns when it comes to interrogative particles: ta ni for human nouns ('who?') and kí ni for non-human nouns ('what?'). The associative construction (covering possessive/genitive and related notions) consists of juxtaposing nouns in the order modified-modifier as in inú àpótí {inside box} 'the inside of the box', fìlà Àkàndé 'Akande's cap' or àpótí aṣọ 'box for clothes'. More than two nouns can be juxtaposed: rélùweè abẹ́ ilẹ̀ (railway underground) 'underground railway', inú àpótí aṣọ 'the inside of the clothes box'. In the rare case that it results in two possible readings, disambiguation is left to the context.  Plural nouns are indicated by a plural word.

There are two 'prepositions': ní 'on, at, in' and sí 'onto, towards'. The former indicates location and absence of movement, and the latter encodes location/direction with movement. Position and direction are expressed by the prepositions in combination with spatial relational nouns like orí 'top', apá 'side', inú 'inside', etí 'edge', abẹ́ 'under', ilẹ̀ 'down', etc. Many of the spatial relational terms are historically related to body-part terms.

Numerals

Yoruba uses a vigesimal (base-20) numbering system.

 Ogún, 20, is a basic numeric block.
 Ogójì, 40, (Ogún-méjì) = 20 multiplied by 2 (èjì).
 Ọgọ́ta, 60, (Ogún-mẹ́ta) = 20 multiplied by 3 (ẹ̀ta).
 Ọgọ́rin, 80, (Ogún-mẹ́rin) = 20 multiplied by 4 (ẹ̀rin).
 Ọgọ́rùn-ún, 100, (Ogún-márùn-ún) = 20 multiplied by 5 (àrún).
 - 16 (Ẹẹ́rìndínlógún) = 4 less than 20.
 - 17 (Ẹẹ́tàdínlógún) = 3 less than 20.
 - 18 (Eéjìdínlógún) = 2 less than 20.
 - 19 (Oókàndínlógún) = 1 less than 20.
 - 21 (Oókànlélógún) = 1 increment on 20.
 - 22 (Eéjìlélógún) = 2 increment on 20.
 - 23 (Ẹẹ́tàlélógún) = 3 increment on 20.
 - 24 (Ẹẹ́rìnlélógún) = 4 increment on 20.
 - 25 (Aárùnlélógún) = 5 increment on 20.

Arabic influence

The wide adoption of imported religions and civilizations such as Islam and Christianity has had an impact both on written and spoken Yoruba. In his Arabic-English Encyclopedic Dictionary of the Quran and Sunnah, Yoruba Muslim scholar Abu-Abdullah Adelabu argued Islam has enriched African languages by providing them with technical and cultural augmentations with Swahili and Somali in East Africa and Turanci Hausa and Wolof in West Africa being the  primary beneficiaries. Adelabu, a Ph D graduate from Damascus cited—among many other common usages—the following words to be Yoruba's derivatives of Arabic vocabularies:

Some loanwords
Sanma: Heaven or sky, from 
Alubarika: blessing, from 
Alumaani: wealth, money, resources, from 
Amin: Arabic form of the Hebrew religious term, Amen, from 
Among commonly Arabic words used in Yoruba are names of the days such as Atalata for Tuesday, Alaruba for Wednesday, Alamisi for Thursday, and Jimoh (Jumu'ah) for Friday. By far Ọjọ́ Jimoh is the most favorably used. It is usually referred to as the unpleasant word for Friday, Ẹtì, which means failure, laziness, or abandonment. Ultimately, the standard words for the days of the week are Àìkú, Ajé, Ìṣẹ́gun, Ọjọ́rú, Ọjọ́bọ, Ẹtì, Àbámẹ́ta, for Sunday, Monday, Tuesday, Wednesday, Thursday, Friday, Saturday respectively. Friday remains Eti in the Yoruba language.

Literature

Spoken literature 
•Odu Ifa, •Oriki, •Ewi, •Esa, •Àlọ́, •Rara, •Iremoje, •Bolojo, •Ijala, •Ajangbode, •Ijeke, Alámọ̀

Written literature 

 Samuel Ajayi Crowther
 Wande Abimbola
 Reverend Samuel Johnson
 Yemi Elebuibon
 Daniel Olorunfemi Fagunwa
 Adebayo Faleti
 Akinwunmi Isola
 Obo Aba Hisanjani
 Duro Ladipo
 J.F. Odunjo
 Afolabi Olabimtan
 Wole Soyinka
 Amos Tutuola
 Lawuyi Ogunniran
 Kola Tubosun

Music
 Ibeyi, Cuban francophone sister duo, native Yoruba speakers.
 Sakara, a Yoruba song originating from Abeokuta, Ogun Nigeria. One of the first performers of this type of music was in Lagos in the 1930s.
 Apala, Apala (or Akpala) is a music genre originally developed by the Yoruba people of Nigeria, during the country's history as a colony of the British Empire. It is a percussion-based style that originated in the late 1970s.
 Fuji, a popular, contemporary Yoruba musical genre.
 Jùjú, a style of Nigerian popular music, derived from traditional Yoruba percussion.
 Àpíìrì, a popular music common among Ido and Igbole Ekiti environs of Ekiti State. The musical instruments usually consist of beaded Calabash guads and gongs supported with harmonic lyrics
 Fela Kuti, Afrobeat creator

See also

 Yoruba numerals
 The Yoruba newspaper Alaroye

Notes and references

Notes

References 

Oyètádé, B. Akíntúndé & Buba, Malami (2000) 'Hausa Loan Words in Yorùbá', in Wolff & Gensler (eds.) Proceedings of the 2nd WoCAL, Leipzig 1997, Köln: Rüdiger Köppe, 241–260.

History

Dictionaries

Grammars and sketches 

 The first grammar of Yoruba.

External links 

 Yoruba Wikipedia
 Omniglot: Yoruba orthography
 Yoruba dictionary
 Yoruba Translation - Free online translation service instantly Yorùbá.
 kasahorow Yoruba Dictionary
 Ọrọ èdè Yorùbá
 lingua: Yoruba-Online-Dictionary English-Yoruba / Yoruba-English
 Sabere d'owo Yoruba video drama series. Radio Abeokuta (2006).
 Yoruba Grammar
 Pan-African Localization page for Yoruba
 Yoruba in North America
 Journal of West African Languages: Yoruba
 yorubaweb.com
 Yoruba blog (features bilingual texts in Yoruba and English, including folklore)
 Abibitumi Kasa Yorùbá Language Resources
 Yorùbá Yé Mi - A Beginning Yorùbá Textbook
 A Vocabulary of the Yoruba Language

 
Analytic languages
Isolating languages
Languages of Benin
Languages of Nigeria
Subject–verb–object languages
Whistled languages
Language
Language
Yoruboid languages
Languages of the Caribbean
Languages of Trinidad and Tobago
Languages of Jamaica
Articles containing video clips